This is a list of tornadoes which have been officially or unofficially labeled as F5, EF5, T10-T11, IF5, or an equivalent rating, the highest possible ratings on the various tornado intensity scales. These scales – the Fujita scale, the Enhanced Fujita scale, the International Fujita scale, and the TORRO tornado intensity scale – attempt to estimate the intensity of a tornado by classifying the damage caused to natural features and man-made structures in the tornado's path.

Tornadoes are among the most violent known meteorological phenomena. Each year, more than 2,000 tornadoes are recorded worldwide, with the vast majority occurring in North America and Europe. In order to assess the intensity of these events, meteorologist Ted Fujita devised a method to estimate maximum wind speeds within tornadic storms based on the damage caused; this became known as the Fujita scale. The scale ranks tornadoes from F0 to F5, with F0 being the least intense and F5 being the most intense.

Following two particularly devastating tornadoes in 1997 and 1999, engineers questioned the reliability of the Fujita scale. Ultimately, a new scale was devised that took into account 28 different damage indicators; this became known as the Enhanced Fujita scale. The Enhanced Fujita scale is used predominantly in North America. Most of Europe, on the other hand, uses the TORRO tornado intensity scale (or T-Scale), which ranks tornado intensity between T0 and T11; F5/EF5 tornadoes are approximately equivalent to T10 to T11 on the T-Scale.

In the United States, between 1950 and January 31, 2007, a total of 50 tornadoes were officially rated F5, and since February 1, 2007, a total of nine tornadoes have been officially rated EF5. Since 1950, Canada has had one tornado officially rated an F5. Outside the United States and Canada, six tornadoes have been officially rated F5/EF5/T10+ or equivalent: two each in France, Germany, and one in Italy and Argentina.

Several other tornadoes have also been documented as possibly attaining this status, though they are not officially rated as such. The work of tornado expert Thomas P. Grazulis revealed the existence of several dozen likely F5 tornadoes between 1880 and 1995. Grazulis also called into question the ratings of several tornadoes currently rated F5 by official sources. Many tornadoes officially rated F4/EF4 or equivalent have been disputed and described as actual F5/EF5/T10+ or equivalent tornadoes, and vice versa; since structures are completely destroyed in both cases, distinguishing between an EF4 tornado and an EF5 tornado is often very difficult. Additionally, because tornado ratings are damage-based, many tornadoes capable of causing F5/EF5/T10+ damage, such as those that move through rural areas, may receive lower ratings because their strongest winds do not strike any suitable damage indicators.

List of events

The tornadoes on this list have been formally rated F5 by an official government source. Unless otherwise noted, the source of the F5 rating is the U.S. National Weather Service (NWS), as shown in the archives of the Storm Prediction Center (SPC) and National Climatic Data Center (NCDC).

Prior to 1950, assessments of F5 tornadoes are based primarily on the work of Thomas P. Grazulis. The NCDC has accepted 38 of his F5 classifications of tornadoes occurring between 1880 and 1950. In addition to the accepted ones, Grazulis rated a further 25 during the same period which were not accepted. From 1950 to 1970, tornadoes were assessed retrospectively, primarily using information recorded in government databases, as well as newspaper photographs and eyewitness accounts. Beginning in 1971, tornadoes were rated by the NWS using on-site damage surveys. Grazulis' work has identified 16 additional F5 tornadoes between 1950 and 1995, with four later being accepted by the NCDC.

As of February 1, 2007, tornadoes in the United States are rated using the Enhanced Fujita Scale, which replaced the Fujita scale in order to more accurately correlate tornadic intensity with damage indicators and to augment and refine damage descriptors. No earlier tornadoes will be reclassified on the Enhanced Fujita scale, and no new tornadoes in the United States will be rated on the original Fujita scale. France and Canada also adopted the EF-Scale in subsequent years. Since the creation of the International Fujita scale in 2018, no tornadoes have been rated IF5.

Official F5/EF5/T10+ tornadoes
Worldwide, a total of 67 tornadoes have been officially rated F5/EF5: 59 in the United States, two each in France and Germany, and one each in Argentina, Australia, Canada, and Italy. Of the 59 tornadoes in the United States, 50 are officially rated F5 on the original Fujita scale (with dates of occurrence between May 11, 1953, and May 3, 1999), and nine are officially rated EF5 on the Enhanced Fujita scale (with dates of occurrence between May 4, 2007, and May 20, 2013). In total, 57 of these tornadoes have been rated F5 and ten have been rated EF5.

Possible F5/EF5/T10+ tornadoes officially rated F4/EF4/T9 or lower

Because the distinctions between F4/EF4/T9 and F5/EF5/T10 tornadoes are often ambiguous, the official ratings of numerous other tornadoes formally rated below F5/EF5/T10 or equivalent have been disputed, with certain government sources or independent studies contradicting the official record. This list includes tornadoes rated F5/EF5/IF5/T10 by government meteorologists, non-government employed tornado experts (i.e. Thomas P. Grazulis or Ted Fujita) or meteorological research institutions (i.e. European Severe Storms Laboratory) that rated a tornado differently than the official government organization in charge of the rating. Published academic papers or presentations at academically held meteorological conferences that rate tornadoes as F5/EF5/IF5/T10 or present some evidence to support damage or winds in that category are also ways a tornado can be added to this list. This list can also include tornadoes previously officially rated as an F5 or EF5, but have since been downgraded officially to a lower rating.

This is a dynamic list and may never be able to satisfy particular standards for completeness. You can help by participating in discussions about tornadoes for this list.

Possible F5/EF5/T10+ tornadoes with no official rating
Many other tornadoes have never been formally rated by an official government source but have nonetheless been described as F5/EF5/T10+ or equivalent, often by independent studies. Most of these tornadoes occurred prior to 1950, before tornadoes were rated according to standardized damage assessments, and their unofficial classifications as F5/EF5/T10+ or equivalent have been made in retrospect, largely on the basis of photographic analysis and eyewitness accounts. A few, such as the Tri-State Tornado of 1925, are widely accepted as F5/EF5/T10+ tornadoes, despite not being rated as such in official records.

This is a dynamic list and may never be able to satisfy particular standards for completeness. You can help by participating in discussions about tornadoes for this list.

See also
 Tornado intensity and damage
 List of tornadoes and tornado outbreaks
List of F4 and EF4 tornadoes
List of F4 and EF4 tornadoes (2010–2019)
List of F4 and EF4 tornadoes (2020–present)
 List of tornadoes striking downtown areas
 Tornado myths

Notes

References

Bibliography

External links
 F5 Tornadoes in the U.S. since 1950 (SPC/NOAA)
 U.S. F5 tornadoes - Tornado History Project
 The Tornado Project
 Climatological Risk of Strong and Violent Tornadoes in the United States (Paper 9.4, Second Conference on Environmental Applications)
 Severe Thunderstorm and Tornado Climatology (NSSL)
 Fujita Scale
 Extreme Weather at the CBC.ca Archives
 List of strong tornadoes from 1879 to 2000

 
Tornado-related lists